In philosophy, the Cartesian other, part of a thought experiment, is any other than the mind of the individual thinking about the experiment. The Other includes the individual's own body. According to the philosopher Descartes, there is a divide intrinsic to consciousness, such that you cannot ever bridge the space between your own consciousness and that of another.

This "other" is in essence theoretical, since one cannot ever be empirically shown such an "other."

Put differently, Descartes concluded cogito ergo sum, "I think, therefore I am," that is, that the presence of a self of which to speak (an "I") proves its existence to oneself; however, according to his Wax Argument, one could never similarly demonstrate the existence of the "other."

René Descartes
Concepts in epistemology
Thought experiments in philosophy of mind